Polyvalent Hall from Craiova is a multi-purpose indoor arena in Craiova, Romania. It has a seating capacity of 4,215 spectators. It is located in the immediate vicinity of the new Ion Oblemenco Stadium.

Events

Regular events

Sports 
Handball
Carpathian Trophy – 2013
Carpathian Trophy – 2017
2017–18 Women's EHF Cup Final – May 11, 2018
Professional kickboxing 
Superkombat World Grand Prix 2012 Final Elimination – November 10, 2012
Superkombat World Grand Prix 2013 – May 18, 2013
 Dynamite Fighting Show 3 – December 14, 2018

Concerts
 
Ștefan Bănică Jr.
Horia Brenciu
Richard Clayderman
Delia
Dire Straits
Lara Fabian
Loredana Groza
Holograf
Paula Seling

References

External links
 RAADPFL

Indoor arenas in Romania
Basketball venues in Romania
Handball venues in Romania
Volleyball venues in Romania
Concert halls in Romania